Harold Alfonso Tejada Canacue (born 27 April 1997) is a Colombian road cyclist, who currently rides for UCI WorldTeam . In August 2020, he was named in the startlist for the 2020 Tour de France.

Major results
2013
 2nd Time trial, National Junior Road Championships
2019
 National Under–23 Road Championships
1st  Road race
1st  Time trial
 1st Stage 7 Tour de l'Avenir
 4th Overall Vuelta a la Independencia Nacional
1st  Young rider classification
2020 
 6th Mont Ventoux Dénivelé Challenge

Grand Tour general classification results timeline

References

External links

1997 births
Living people
Colombian male cyclists
People from Huila Department